Kundargi is a village in Gokak taluk Belagavi district in Karnataka, India. beside the river Hedkal Dam.

References

Belgaum division
Villages in Bagalkot district